Carlos Alberto Pérez Alcaraz (born 17 May 1984, in Yhú) is a Paraguayan footballer who plays for Pacífico FC of the Peruvian Primera División.

He previously played for O'Higgins (2004) in Chile, for 3 de Febrero (2005–06), Cerro Porteño (2007), 12 de Octubre (2007) and Independiente (Campo Grande) (2011) in Paraguay, and for Sport Boys (2008, 2012), San Martín de Porres (2008–09), Melgar (2009–10) and Sport Huancayo (2011) in Peru.

Honours
 Pacífico FC 2012 (Peruvian Segunda División Championship)

References
 Profile at BDFA 
 

1984 births
Living people
Paraguayan footballers
Paraguayan expatriate footballers
12 de Octubre Football Club players
Cerro Porteño players
Sport Boys footballers
O'Higgins F.C. footballers
Comerciantes Unidos footballers
Chilean Primera División players
Expatriate footballers in Chile
Expatriate footballers in Peru
Association football forwards